Bratislava Castle is the main castle of Bratislava, the capital of Slovakia. The massive rectangular building with four corner towers stands on an isolated rocky hill of the Little Carpathians directly above the Danube river in the middle of Bratislava. Because of its size and location, it has been a dominant feature of the city for centuries.

The location provides excellent views of Bratislava, Austria and, in clear weather, parts of Hungary. Many legends are connected with the history of the castle.

The castle site
The following are at the castle site:

Castle building (The Palace)
The largest and tallest tower is the Crown Tower on the southwest corner. The  tower dates from the 13th century and for approximately 200 years beginning in the mid-1500s housed the crown jewels of Hungary. The exterior walls and inside corridors contain fragments of old Gothic and Renaissance construction elements. The walled-up entrance gate from the 16th century is still visible to the east of the main hall/entrance.

Museum
Behind the entrance is an arcade corridor leading to a large Baroque staircase which, in turn, leads to the exhibitions of the Slovak National Museum on the second floor. The west wing of this floor houses the 4 halls of the Treasure Chamber (opened in 1988) with a collection of the most precious archaeological finds and other objects of Slovakia, including the prehistoric statue called the Venus of Moravany. The third floor houses the exhibition on the History of Slovakia. The first floor in the south wing of the building houses the rooms of Slovak parliament — the National Council of the Slovak Republic - including furnishings from the 16th century. The northern wing of the building- the former Baroque chapel, houses the Music Hall in which concerts are held. The courtyard includes the entrance to the Knights Hall.

Entrance gates

 Sigismund Gate in the southeast– the best preserved original part of the site, built in the 15th century
 Vienna Gate in the southwest – built in 1712
 Nicholas Gate in the northeast – built in the 16th century
 Leopold Gate

Other buildings
To the west of the main building, is the newly reconstructed F. A. Hillebrandt building which dates from 1762 and was destroyed by the 1811 fire. The Yard of Honor is the space directly before the castle entrance dates from the late 18th century.
Inside the Sigismund Gate and below the Court of Honor, is the Leopold Yard with bastions, constructed in the 17th century.
To the east of the castle building the constellation of the Great Moravian basilica (9th century), the Church of St Savior (11th century) and other Early medieval objects is indicated on the ground. The true archaeological findings are directly below this indicated constellation.

Adjacent to the Nicholas Gate, a Gothic gateway from the 15th century in the northeast quadrant, is the Lugiland Bastion.  This is a long three-floor building from the 17th century which currently houses the National Council of the Slovak Republic, and a Baroque stable (today a famous restaurant). An English landscape garden is located to the south of the stable.
The northern border of the site is formed by a long Baroque building from the 18th century, which today houses the Slovak National Museum and the castle administration.

History

Prehistory (2800 – 450 BC)

The castle's site, like today's city, has been inhabited for thousands of years, because it is strategically located in the center of Europe at a passage between the Carpathians and the Alps, at an important ford used to cross the Danube river, and at an important crossing of central European ancient (trade) routes running from the Balkans or the Adriatic Sea to the Rhine river or the Baltic Sea, the most important route being the Amber Route.

The people of the Boleráz culture (the oldest phase of the Baden culture) were the first known culture to have constructed settlements on the castle hill. This happened around 3500 BC (i.e. in the high Eneolithic Period). Their "castle" was a fortified settlement and a kind of acropolis for settlements in today's Old Town of Bratislava.

Further major findings from the castle hill are from the Hallstatt Period (Early Iron Age, 750 – 450 BC). At that time the people of the Kalenderberg Culture constructed a building plunged into the rock of the castle hill. Again, the "castle" served as an acropolis for settlements found in the western part of the Old Town.

Celts and Romans (450 BC – 5th Century AD)

During the La Tène Period (Late Iron Age, Celtic Period, 450 BC – 1 BC ), the castle hill became a very important center of the Celts. In the last century BC (after 125 BC), the "castle" served as the acropolis of an oppidum (town) of the Celtic Boii. A great number and diversity of findings (including coins, house equipment, two Roman buildings, castle entrance gate etc.) testifies to this.

The castle hill, which was situated at the Danube and thus since 9 BC at the border of the Roman Empire, was also settled by the Romans during the Roman Period (1st to 4th century AD) as findings of bricks of Roman legions (Legion XIII GAN, Legion X GEPF etc.) and some parts of architecture (a Roman figural relief, roof parts etc.) suggest.

The developments in the 5th century (the time of the Great Migration of Peoples) are largely unclear.

Slavs, Nitrian Principality, Great Moravia (500 – 907)

The situation changed with the arrival of the Slavs in the territory of Bratislava. Initially, they partly used older Roman and Celtic structures and added some fortifications. Probably at the end of the 8th century  (definitely not later than in the early 9th century), at the time of the Principality of Nitra, a Slavic castle with a wooden rampart was constructed with a huge area of 55,000 square metres. In the second half of the 9th century, at the time of Great Moravia, a palace of stone surrounded by dwellings and a big basilica were added. 

The basilica is the largest Great Moravian basilica from the territory of Slovakia, and the area of the castle is approximately the same as that of the Mikulčice site (the historical town "Moravia"), which is the most important Great Moravian archaeological site.

Material from old Roman buildings was used to construct this Slavic castle in Bratislava. This could be a confirmation of the disputed statement of Aventinus from the 16th century, who – referring to lost sources – claimed that around 805/7 the Great Moravian prince Uratislaus (i.e. Vratislav) constructed today's Bratislava (Castle?) at the place of a destroyed Roman frontier fort called Pisonium, and the new settlement was named after him Uratislaburgium / Wratisslaburgium. Another probable fact is that around 900 the castle and the territory it controlled was given in fief to Predslav the third son of the Great Moravian king Svätopluk and that Pre(d) slav, or a person of the same name, is the person after which the castle and the town received its old German name Pressburg (from which the old Slovak name Prešporek is derived). 

The oldest version of this name was Preslava (Slovak) / Preslav(a) sburg (German). It appeared for the first time in 907 (Battle of Pressburg) in the forms Brezalauspurc(h), Braslavespurch and Pressalauspruch and then around 1000 on Hungarian coins as Preslav(v) a Civitas (meaning Bratislava Castle). On the other hand, the exact location of Brezalauspurc is still disputed.

High and Late Middle Ages (907 – 1531)

The construction of a new castle of stone started in the 10th century, but work lagged. Under King Stephen I of Hungary (1000–1038), however, the castle was already one of the central castles of the Kingdom of Hungary. It became the seat of Pozsony county and protected the kingdom against Bohemian (Czech) and German attacks (e.g. in 1030, 1042, 1052, 1108, 1146) and played an important role in throne struggles in the Kingdom of Hungary (e.g. struggles after the death of King Stephen I). In 1052 Henry III tried to occupy the castle. According to Hungarian tradition Zothmund a Hungarian soldier, swam to the ships of the invading fleet to drill holes in them, and they were sunk. King Solomon of Hungary had lived here until he was taken to the jail of Nyitra according to Ladislaus I's order. At the same time the old rampart was modernized and the Church of the St. Savior with a chapter and a church school were added. Stephen III of Hungary escaped from his enemies to the castle almost 100 years later.

The castle was turned into a proto-Romanesque palace of stone in the 12th century (probably after 1179), maybe because King Béla III (1173–1196) decided to make Esztergom the definitive seat of kings of the Kingdom of Hungary. It was a palace similar to those constructed in Germany under Friedrich Barbarossa. In 1182 Friedrich Barbarossa gathered his crusader army under the castle. The church institutions and building at the castle were moved to the town below the castle in the early 12th century.

The well-fortified Pressburg Castle was among the few castles of the Kingdom of Hungary to be able to withstand Mongol attacks in 1241 and 1242. As a reaction to these attacks, a huge "tower for the protection of the kingdom" was constructed at the castle building in 1245 immediately next to two older palaces. The tower was actually a huge high residential building. In addition, 7 (genuine) square towers were built into the old rampart and a stone wall was added around the castle proper (i.e. the residential building). The biggest of the rampart towers was at the same time a corner tower of the stone wall. Today it is a part of the castle building — it is identical with the present-day "Crown tower", which is the largest of the four existing towers of the structure. It was probably built around 1250 when Knights of St. John were active at the castle.

On 25 October 1265 the Czech King, Přemysl Otakar and the Hungarian King Béla IV.'s grandchild Kunigunde, were engaged here. Andrew II and Gertrude's daughter, Elisabeth was born here.
The new castle faced further conflicts. In 1271, King Otakar II of Bohemia invaded the territory of today's western Slovakia and charged the knight Egid with the administration of the conquered castle. Egid rebelled against Otakar two years later and was defeated by Otakar, but due to problems in Bohemia, Otakar had to leave this territory. In 1285-86, the noble Nicholas Kőszegi occupied the castle in order to use it as a basis for a rebellion against the Hungarian king, but he was defeated. Shortly afterwards, 1287–1291, the Austrian duke Albert of Habsburg, supporting Nicholas, occupied the castle, but was defeated by Matthew III Csák, who was made county head of Pozsony county for this. A more or less successful Austrian occupation of the castle and the county occurred in 1302-1312/1322 by Duke Rudolf.

As a result of these permanent fighting, the Hungarian king granted the city rights (town charter) to a part of the settlements below the castle in 1291, thereby withdrawing them from the authority of the county head in the castle. Some settlements on the castle hill remained under the castle's authority and the fortification was gradually extended to them.

In 1385, King Sigismund of Luxembourg occupied the castle and Pozsony county and one year later put the county in pawn to his cousins, the Moravian margraves Prokop and Jošt in exchange for a loan they provided to him. The castle was reconquered by Stibor of Stiboricz in 1389, who was made the county head of the Pozsony county in 1389-1402 as a reward. He had a chapel built in Bratislava Castle.

Another ally of King Sigismund, especially in his fights against the Czech Hussites, was the noble family Rozgonyi, which received the Pozsony county head function in 1421. At some point between 1420 and 1430, King Sigismund (Holy Roman Emperor) decided to make Bratislava Castle – due to its central location — the center of his new German-Czech-Hungarian empire. In 1423, the king ordered the Rozgonyis to improve the fortifications of the castle as a protection against Hussite attacks, because the castle was situated close to the Czech border and it was still protected only by the old wooden ramparts. They replaced the old rampart with a new better stone bulwark. Then between 1431 and 1434 a total rearrangement of Pressburg castle took place. Experts from Germany were invited, material was transported from Austria, towns were imposed special taxes specifically for the construction of the planned largest castle ever built. The construction master was Konrad von Erlingen. The residential "tower" was demolished, and the form of the new Gothic palace was approximately similar to that of the present-day castle (but without two towers). Today, the only completely preserved part of the castle from that time is the Sigismund Gate (wrongly called the Corvinus Gate), i.e. the eastern entrance gate in the bulwark. Smaller parts have been preserve in the main palace. Sigismund plans, however, did not materialize, because the castle was never made Sigismund's residence and Sigismund always lived in the town below the castle.

After Sigismund's death in 1437, his widow Barbara of Celje was imprisoned in the castle by the new king Albert of Habsburg. In 1438, Albert's daughter, Anne was engaged to the margrave William III, Landgrave of Thuringia in the castle. John Hunyadi and his wife Erzsébet Szilágyi also stayed here and Hungarian women respected them. Later on, Ladislas the Posthumous was probably living in the castle (parts of the castle were adapted for him at least). In 1440-1443, there were fighting between the castle of Pressburg ruled by county heads from the Rozgonyi family (supporting King Władysław III of Poland) and the town of Pressburg (supporting – and owned by – Queen Elisabeth which ruled for the young Ladislaus Posthumus) – see History of Pressburg for details. Castle repairs of 1438, 1452 and 1463 included repairs of damages caused by the above conflict. A water well was constructed in the yard of the castle in the 15th century.

Main castle of the Kingdom of Hungary (1531 – 1783)

Political events

In 1536 (de facto already in 1531), after the Turks (the Ottoman Empire) had conquered present-day Hungary, Pressburg became the capital (seat of the Diet and of central authorities, place of coronations) of the remaining Kingdom of Hungary, which was renamed Royal Hungary and was ruled by the Austrian Habsburgs now. Consequently, Pressburg Castle became the most important royal castle and the formal seat of the kings of Royal Hungary (who however resided in Vienna normally). At the same time, from the beginning of the 16th century, Pressburg and its castle had to face various anti-Habsburg uprisings in Royal Hungary on the territory of Slovakia. For example, troops of Gabriel Bethlen occupied the castle between 1619 and 1621, when it was reconquered by Habsburg troops, and had the royal crown removed from Pressburg Castle till 1622. Between 1671 and 1677, Pressburg Castle was home to an extraordinary court against the Protestants and participants of anti-Habsburg uprisings. Imre Thököly, the leader of another big anti-Habsburg uprising, failed to conquer the castle in 1682-83.

Holy Crown of Hungary in the crown tower

Between 1552 and 1784 the Holy Crown of Hungary stayed in the castle. Two Hungarian crown guards, 50 Hungarian and 50 Austrian infantry soldiers cared for it. Hungarian Kings who derived from foreign dynasties as Habsburgs could not possess it, and only had access to the crown during their coronation ceremony.

The Renaissance conversion
Immediately after the defeat of the Kingdom of Hungary in the battle at Mohács in 1526, during which the king died, the queen – Maria of Habsburg – fled with her retinue from Buda to Pressburg. The royal treasure (mostly very valuable objects of art, the royal scepter, apple and sword, the globe of Ladislaus of Jagiello known as Astrolabium etc.) and many other important objects she has taken with her were deposited in Pressburg Castle and guarded by the royal burgrave John Bornemisza. Shortly afterwards, however, this precious treasure was mostly destroyed by the new king Ferdinand I of Habsburg, who needed it to finance his participation in a civil war in Royal Hungary, and smaller parts went to the Treasury Chamber of Vienna (Wiener Schatzkammer), or became personal property of Maria, or got lost forever.

Taking into account the new role of the castle, the emperor Ferdinand I of Habsburg had it rebuilt into a Renaissance castle by Italian builders and artists, such as Giulio Licino da Pordanone and Maciotanus Ulisses from Rome, between 1552 and 1562 (but some work continued even afterwards). The main designer and supervisor of the construction was the Italian architect Pietro Ferrabosco, who had been serving the emperor in Vienna and knew Count Eck Salm, the captain of Pressburg from 1552 – 1571. The building's form did not change (except that the entrance was shifted), but it was completely changed inside and outside. Above all, floors and rooms were rearranged, and most rooms received precious (golden etc.) equipment. In the late 16th century, a ball house (for various ball games) at the eastern wall and a second, better water well were added. Unfortunately, basically only one part of the castle chapel has been completely preserved from this time, paradoxically because it was walled up as “unnecessary” in the 17th century. As for the rest of the site, there were wooden dwellings for the guards (up to the 18th century) in the north-west, a (today unknown) “old tower” somewhere to the left of the castle building was improved, and the western entrance gate of the site was replaced by a big armoury.

In terms of the castle's functions after 1530, the castle was home to selected participants of Diet meetings (including apartments of the king (emperor), which have been already there since the Gothic reconstruction ), to some central authorities of Royal Hungary, the county head of Bratislava etc., to the apartment of the Governor of Royal Hungary (usually a brother of the emperor), and since 1552, the crown jewels were deposited here as well – in what is today known as the Crown Tower. Initial and final meetings of the Diet took place in the castle too.

Baroque conversions

Early Baroque
Since some of the Renaissance changes were done in haste (especially the wooden roof), as early as in 1616 a new, gradual Early Baroque reconstruction started based on a design by the main imperial architect Giovanni Battista Carlone. The works were intensified in 1635 and finished around 1647. It was mostly financed by Count Paul Pálffy (Pálfi), the captain of the castle and county head of Pozsony county. The look the castle received through this conversion is basically the look the castle has kept till the present. The northern and western part of the main building have been newly built and a new, 3rd floor was added in the whole building, the main entrance was shifted back to the middle of the wall, the ancient fortifications were improved, the chapel was shifted from the southern part to the northern part (today's Musical Hall), and 2 new towers were added – yielding in sum the present 4 towers in the corners. As a reward for not having misappropriated state funds during the conversion, the Diet appointed Count Paul Pálffy lifelong captain of Pressburg Castle, county head of the Pozsony county and usufructuary of the castle (which remained in possession of the crown) in 1650. One year later, the emperor made those functions and titles hereditary for the Pálffys.

In 1653, all wooden ceilings turned out to be bad and had to be replaced in the following years, so that precious paintings placed on them got lost. Ten years later, facing one of frequent Turkish (Ottoman) attacks to the territory of Slovakia, the fortifications were improved under the leadership of the military engineer Josef Priami of the Imperial Court in Vienna. Further improvements of the fortifications followed around 1673. They ended with the final defeat of the Turks at Vienna in 1683. In 1703, barracks were built in the north-east of the site and the armoury was turned into barracks too. The present-day Vienna Gate was constructed on the occasion of the coronation of Emperor Charles VI in 1712 and it was used as the main entrance to the castle site since then.

The Maria Theresa conversion

When Maria Theresa of Austria became the queen of the Kingdom of Hungary in 1740, she promised to the nobles of the kingdom that she would have a residence both in Austria and in the Kingdom of Hungary – that is in Pressburg Castle. She kept the promise and spent much time in Bratislava. A corresponding conversion of the defense castle into a (at that time) modern royal residence was performed between 1761 and 1766.

Minor changes however were done as early as from 1740 onwards: besides various changes in the interior, a large garden was added in the northern part of the site and Emperor Francis I (Maria Theresa's husband, who was interested in botany) created a small garden to the east of the castle building. The chief designer until 1757 was J. B. Martinelli.

The Hungarian orders supported Maria Theresa with "Vitam et Sanguinem" exclamation marks in the castle at Seven Years' War's time.

Major changes inside the castle (in the rococo style) were begun in 1760. The new chief designer between 1761 and 1762 was Franz Anton Hillebrandt. A new single floor building for the kitchen, servants and horses was added to the western wall of the castle. Because the water supply for the castle was not sufficient, Maria Theresa had Johann Wolfgang von Kempelen build a special water pipe drawing water from a tank in the town at the Danube bank using pumps. The stairs throughout the castle were rebuilt with a lower gradient, on Maria Theresa's request, to enable her to ride her horse upon them. The result of these changes, as for the exterior of the palace itself and the site gates, was very similar to Bratislava Castle as we know it today.

Due to disputes with Hungarian nobles, Maria Theresa did not appoint a palatine, who used to represent the nobles, and instead in 1765 appointed a governor for the Kingdom of Hungary, who obeyed the queen. Bratislava Castle became his seat and the office of the county head left the castle. The second governor was Albert of Saxe-Teschen since 1765, the queen's son-in-law – the husband of queen's favorite daughter, Marie Christine of Austria. Albert and Maria Christine moved to the castle in 1766. Since both of them were promoters of culture and science, the castle and the town became a place of frequent events and visits in the sphere of culture and science.

Because the governor did not have enough space, a new palace (later called the Theresianum) was built at the eastern wall of the castle building in 1767 - 1770. It had been designed by F. A. Hillebrandt in the classic style. Its furnishings were very expensive and precious and included hundreds of objects of art. The first floor was home to a family gallery, which later became the basis of today's Albertina Gallery in Vienna.

In addition, a winter riding school was added at the northern end of the castle site, a summer riding school was situated directly in the castle yard, both castle gardens were adapted (in the Schönbrunn style), and night lighting using oil lanterns was introduced on the access road to the castle for the first time in history. In 1770, Maria Theresa herself ordered further valuable paintings and furniture to be provided to both the main castle and the Theresianum, and the governor moved into the completed Theresianum. Maria Theresa visited them frequently there, however mostly unofficially.

Loss of importance and destruction (1783 – 1811)
The office of governor of the Kingdom of Hungary was re-abolished in 1781 by the new king Joseph II, and Albert of Sachsen-Teschen left the castle and took many parts of the equipment away. The (present-day Albertina Gallery) art collection went partly to Vienna, partly to Belgium, where Albert became a new governor. Other objects moved mostly to Vienna. In 1783, Pressburg ceased to be the seat of central authorities of the kingdom. They were moved to Buda (now Budapest). The crown jewels of the Kingdom of Hungary were moved to the Hofburg in Vienna.

In 1784, the Theresianum, some other secondary buildings of the site, and the gardens were adapted, because the castle became a "general seminary", which was a type of state school for Catholic priests introduced by Joseph II. The general seminary of Pressburg Castle played an important role in Slovakia's history, because it has educated many important Slovak intellectuals, for example Anton Bernolák, the author of the first successful codification of a Slovak standard language.

In 1802, the general seminary moved to another place, and the castle was assigned to the military as barracks. This was the beginning of the end of the castle. The rococo interiors of the castle were adapted in order to house some 1500 soldiers. In 1809, the Pressburg and the castle was bombarded by cannons by Napoleon's troops. On 28 May 1811, the castle burst into huge flames due to carelessness of garrison soldiers. The fire even spread into parts of the town.

Castle in ruins (1811 – 1953)
The destroyed castle gradually deteriorated. The military sold parts of the main castle buildings as construction materials in the surrounding areas. Between the two world wars, attempts were made to demolish the castle to build government offices and a university district on the castle hill and in its surroundings in the first Czechoslovak Republic and in the first Slovak Republic.
Many parts of the site however continued to be used as barracks and adapted accordingly until 1946.

In 1946, the ruin was opened to the public. Two years later, the town constructed an amphitheater in the northern part of the castle site. The amphitheater was in use for some 15 years. Films were shown there in the summer.

Restoration and modern history (after 1953)

Finally, it was decided to restore the castle. Archaeological and architectural research started in 1953 and long restoration works began in 1957. The restoration was done to the last (Baroque) state of the main building, but at many places older (Gothic, Renaissance) preserved elements or parts have been restored. The Theresianum has not been restored and the F. A. Hillebrandt building of 1762 was restored only around the year 2000. The Slovak painter Janko Alexy gained recognition for the restoration of the castle. The finishing of the restoration in 1968 was interrupted in August 1968, when the castle was occupied by Warsaw Pact troops (see Prague Spring). On 28 October 1968, however, the Federation Law, turning the centralist state of Czechoslovakia into a federation of a Czech Socialist Republic (later called Czech Republic) and a Slovak Socialist Republic (later called Slovak Republic), was signed in the Federation Hall of the castle. On 3 September 1992, the new constitution of independent Slovakia was signed in the Knights Hall of the castle.

Since 1968, the castle has been housing exhibitions of the Slovak National Museum and at the same time its rooms have been used by the National Council of the Slovak Republic (today the National Council of the Slovak Republic) for presentation purposes. In 1992, the castle housed a branch-office of the Czechoslovak president temporarily and later in the 1990s the Slovak president temporarily. It still houses the museum and the presentation rooms for the National Council of the Slovak Republic and for the president. A new restoration has been planned for years, because since 1968 (except for adding the F. A. Hillebrandt building) only minor adaptations have been performed, such as the 1988 creation of the Treasure Chamber, the 1995 replacement of glass in the arcades of the solemn staircase, and the 1996-97 complete repair of the roof. The last minor adaptations occurred on the occasion of the Bush-Putin Bratislava summit in February 2005. A massive reconstruction was started in 2008. It should take 5 years and cost 1.5 to 2 billion Slovak korunas (47.06 to 62.75 million euro).

On June 6, 2010 the reconstruction of the Honorary Courtyard of Bratislava Castle was completed with a large nationally televised unveiling ceremony of an equestrian statue of King Svätopluk I by Slovak sculptor Ján Kulich.

See also
History of Bratislava

Notes

References

External links

Bratislava Castle at SlovakHeritage.org
Bratislava Castle at Castles.sk
Restoration of the castle (official website)
Panoramic virtual tour of castle & view over Bratislava in 2007
Getting to Bratislava castle

Buildings and structures in Bratislava
Castles in Slovakia
History of Bratislava
Tourist attractions in Bratislava
Great Moravia
Boii
9th-century architecture in Slovakia
15th-century architecture in Slovakia
9th-century fortifications
15th-century fortifications
Buildings and structures completed in 1434
Buildings and structures completed in 1964